Neil Patel may refer to:

 Neil Patel (designer), Welsh-American production designer
 Neil Patel (political advisor), American political advisor, publisher, co-founder of The Daily Caller
 Neil Patel, American politician and candidate for 2022 United States Senate election in Ohio